Eduardo "Morpheus" Maiorino (August 16, 1979 – December 23, 2012) was a Brazilian professional kickboxer and mixed martial artist. He was a three time Brazilian Heavyweight Muay Thai Champion, the K-1 Brazil 2004 Tournament finalist and champion, and a World Muay Thai Association (WMA) Super Heavyweight World Champion.

Biography and career
Eduardo Maiorino de Morais was born in Campo Grande, Mato Grosso do Sul, Brazil and died December 23, 2012, after a  heart attack.  He was 33.

Titles
 2011 WKBC World Champion (Heavyweight division).
 2010 2nd place in World Championship WMA (World Muay Thai Association) Hangzhou, China.
 2010 10th place in world rankings in WBC Muay Thai (super cruiserweight division).
 2009 3rd in rankings IMC International Muay Thai Council.
 2009 World Champion (Super Heavyweight division) World Kickboxing League.
 2009 World Heavyweight Champ (WKL).
 2008 State champion in Jiu-Jitsu.
 2007 Brazilian Muay thai champion.
 2007 Brazilian Champion of Demolition Fight III Muay Thai.
 2006 Brazilian Vale Tudo tournament champion.
 Three times Brazilian Muay Thai Champion C.B.M.T "Brazilian Muay Thai Confederation" (2005, 2004, 2003).
 2004 Vitória Extreme Fight MMA Grand Prix Champion.
 2004 K-1 Brazil Challenge Champion.
 2004 WKN Brazilian Muay Thai Champion.
 2004 Champion of K-1 Brazil Grand Prix in Goiânia-GO.
 2003 3rd World M-1 Kickboxing GP in Venice-ITA.
 2003 2nd place in K-1 Brazil Grand Prix (São Paulo-SP).
 2003–05 Brazilian Muay Thai Confederation Champion.
 2003 K-1 World Grand Prix Preliminary Brazil runner up
 2002 Centro-Oeste Boxing champion.

Mixed martial arts record

|-
|Loss
|align=center|3–9
| Vinicius Lima
|KO (punch)
|Hard Fight Championship 
|
|align=center|1
|align=center|0:24 
|Cuiabá, Mato Grosso, Brazil
|
|-
|Loss
|align=center|3–8
| Geronimo dos Santos
|KO (punches)
|MF – Max Fight 13 
|
|align=center|1
|align=center|0:50 
|São Paulo, Brazil
|
|-
|Win
|align=center|3–7
| Gerald Hill
|KO (punches)
|Sugar Creek Showdown 5 
|
|align=center|1
|align=center|0:31 
|Hinton, Oklahoma
|
|-
|Loss
|align=center|2–7
| Rodrigo Gripp de Sousa
|Submission (guillotine choke)
|Open Fight
|
|align=center|1
|align=center|N/A
|Brazil
|
|-
|Loss
|align=center|2–6
| Junior dos Santos
|Submission (guillotine choke)
|Minotauro Fights 5
|
|align=center|1
|align=center|0:50
|São Paulo, Brazil
|
|-
|Loss
|align=center|2–5
| Assuerio Silva
|TKO (punches)
|Show Fight 5
|
|align=center|1
|align=center|N/A
|São Paulo, Brazil
|
|-
|Loss
|align=center|2–4
| Rafael Cavalcante
|TKO (strikes)
|Pantanal Combat
|
|align=center|1
|align=center|N/A
|Brazil
|
|-
|Loss
|align=center|2–3
| Edson Claas Vieira
|TKO (submission to punches)
|Meca World Vale Tudo 12
|
|align=center|1
|align=center|0:42
|Rio de Janeiro, Brazil
|
|-
|Loss
|align=center|2–2
| Alessio Sakara
|KO (punches)
|Real Fight 1
|
|align=center|1
|align=center|0:30
|Rio de Janeiro, Brazil
|
|-
|Win
|align=center|2–1
| Danilo Pereira
|Decision (split)
|Vitoria Extreme Fighting 1
|
|align=center|N/A
|align=center|N/A
|Vitoria, Brazil
|
|-
|Win
|align=center|1–1
| Chico Melo
|KO (strikes)
|Vitoria Extreme Fighting 1
|
|align=center|3
|align=center|N/A
|Vitoria, Brazil
|
|-
|Loss
|align=center|0–1
| Claudineney Kozan
|Submission (guillotine choke)
|K-1 Brazil – New Stars
|
|align=center|1
|align=center|0:55
|Curitiba, Brazil
|
|-

Kickboxing record (Incomplete)

|-
|-  bgcolor="#FFBBBB"
| 2012-12-01 || Loss ||align=left| Igor Bugaenko || Tatneft Cup 2013 2nd selection 1/8 final (+91 kg) || Kazan, Russia || KO || 1 || N/A
|-
|-  bgcolor="#FFBBBB"
| 2012-09-01 || Loss ||align=left| Steve Bonner || N/A || Perth, Western Australia || TKO  || 1 || N/A
|-
! style=background:white colspan=9 |
|-
|-  bgcolor="#FFBBBB"
| 2010-12-19 || Loss ||align=left| Steve Banks || N/A || Hainan Island, China || Decision  || 5 || 3:00
|-
! style=background:white colspan=9 |
|-
|-  bgcolor="#FFBBBB"
| 2010-11-06 || Loss ||align=left| Steve McKinnon || Immortality 3|| Australia || TKO  || 2 || N/A
|-
! style=background:white colspan=9 |
|-
|-  bgcolor="#FFBBBB"
| 2010-05-22 || Loss ||align=left| Steve Bonner ||World Muay Thai Championship || Zhangzhou, China || KO  || 4 || N/A
|-
! style=background:white colspan=9 |
|-
|-  bgcolor="#FFBBBB"
| 2010-01-16 || Loss ||align=left| Ramazan Ramazanov || Thailand vs Challenger Series, Royal Paragon Hall || Bangkok, Thailand || KO  || 1 || N/A
|-  bgcolor="#FFBBBB"
| 2009-06-20 || Loss ||align=left| Andrew Peck || New Zealand vs. Brazil || Auckland, New Zealand || N/A || N/A || N/A
|-  bgcolor="#FFBBBB"
| 2009-06-06 || Loss ||align=left| Alain Ngalani || Planet Battle III|| Hong Kong || KO || 1 || N/A
|-
|-  bgcolor="#FFBBBB"
| 2009-05-30 || Loss ||align=left| Faisal Zakaria || The Challenger 2009 || Macau, China || KO || N/A || N/A
|-  bgcolor="#FFBBBB"
| 2008-06-26 || Loss ||align=left| Dževad Poturak || Planet Battle: Where Champions Collide || Hong Kong || KO || 1 || 1:09
|-
|-  bgcolor="#FFBBBB"
| 2007-05-25 || Loss ||align=left| Duke Roufus || Colosseum 5 || N/A || TKO || 2 || 0:56
|-
|-  bgcolor="#FFBBBB"
| 2007-03-10 || Loss ||align=left| Vitor Miranda || Floripa Fight 3 || Florianópolis, Brazil || KO || 1 || N/A
|-
|-  bgcolor="#FFBBBB"
| 2006-09-23 || Loss ||align=left| Vitor Miranda || Demolition IV || São Paulo, Brazil || KO || 2 || 1:16
|-
|-  bgcolor="#CCFFCC"
| 2006-04-08 || Win ||align=left| Montanha Silva || Demolition Fight 3 || São Paulo, Brazil || Decision || 3 || 3:00
|-
|-  bgcolor="#CCFFCC"
| 2005-10-22 || Win ||align=left| Cleber Adao || K-1 Brazil Grand Prix 2005 in São Paulo, Quarter Finals || Serra Negra, Brazil || Decision || 3 || 3:00
|-
! style=background:white colspan=9 |
|-
|-  bgcolor="#CCFFCC"
| 2004-10-30 || Win ||align=left| Vitor Miranda || K-1 Brazil 2004 Challenge, Final || Goiânia, Brazil || Decision || 3 || 3:00
|-
! style=background:white colspan=9 |
|- 
|-  bgcolor="#CCFFCC"
| 2004-10-30 || Win ||align=left| Dierlei de Souza Rodrigues || K-1 Brazil 2004 Challenge, Semi Finals || Goiânia, Brazil || KO || 3 || 1:04
|-
|-  bgcolor="#CCFFCC"
| 2004-10-30 || Win ||align=left| Joabe Silva de Jesus || K-1 Brazil 2004 Challenge, Quarter Finals || Goiânia, Brazil || TKO || 3 || 0:32
|-
|-  bgcolor="#FFBBBB"
| 2003-11-27 || Loss ||align=left| Claudinei Litaver Kozan || K-1 MMA in Brazil || Curitiba, Brasil || Submission (guillotine choke) || 1 || 0:55
|-
|-  bgcolor="#FFBBBB"
| 2003-05-02 || Loss ||align=left| Rick Roufus || K-1 World Grand Prix 2003 in Las Vegas Quarter-final || Las Vegas, USA || TKO || 1 || 2:54 
|-
|-  bgcolor="#FFBBBB"
| 2003-02-23 || Loss ||align=left| Jefferson Silva || K-1 World Grand Prix 2003 Preliminary Brazil, Final || São Paulo, Brazil || Decision || 3 || 3:00
|-
! style=background:white colspan=9 |
|- 
|-  bgcolor="#CCFFCC"
| 2003-02-23 || Win ||align=left| Luis dos Santos || K-1 World Grand Prix 2003 Preliminary Brazil, Semi Finals || São Paulo, Brazil || Decision || 3 || 3:00
|-
|-  bgcolor="#CCFFCC"
| 2003-02-23 || Win ||align=left| Laerte Rezende Jr. || K-1 World Grand Prix 2003 Preliminary Brazil, Quarter Finals || São Paulo, Brazil || TKO || 2 || N/A
|-

See also
 List of male kickboxers
 List of K-1 events

References

External links
 

1979 births
2012 deaths
Brazilian male kickboxers
Brazilian male karateka
Brazilian Muay Thai practitioners
Brazilian practitioners of Brazilian jiu-jitsu
Heavyweight kickboxers
Brazilian male mixed martial artists
Light heavyweight mixed martial artists
Heavyweight mixed martial artists
Mixed martial artists utilizing Muay Thai
Mixed martial artists utilizing karate
Mixed martial artists utilizing Brazilian jiu-jitsu
Sportspeople from Mato Grosso do Sul